The 2010 Holy Cross Crusaders football team was an American football team that represented the College of the Holy Cross during the 2010 NCAA Division I FCS football season. Holy Cross tied for second in the Patriot League. 

In their seventh year under head coach Tom Gilmore, the Crusaders compiled a 6–5 record. Anthony DiMichele, Sean Lamkin and Freddie Santana were the team captains.

Despite their winning record, the Crusaders were outscored 254 to 249. Their 3–2 conference record tied with Colgate for second-best in the Patriot League standings. Holy Cross' homecoming win over Fordham did not count in its league record, as Fordham had been disqualified from the championship after admitting scholarship players. 

Holy Cross was ranked No. 25 in the preseason national top 25, but dropped out of the rankings after their opening week, and remained unranked for the rest of the year.

Holy Cross played its home games at Fitton Field on the college campus in Worcester, Massachusetts.

Schedule

References

Holy Cross
Holy Cross Crusaders football seasons
Holy Cross Crusaders football